Tan Sri Yahaya bin Ahmad (11 August 1947 – 2 March 1997) was the founder, chairman and chief executive officer of the DRB-HICOM Group of Malaysia. He was famously known as Malaysia's "Car Czar".

Biography
Yahaya Ahmad was born on 11 August 1947 in Marang, Terengganu, Malaysia. He received his education from Malay College Kuala Kangsar in Kuala Kangsar, Perak. Tan Sri Yahaya Ahmad was married with Puan Sri Rohana Othman on 17 January 1979 and have four children. They lived in Kelana Jaya, Petaling Jaya, Selangor.

DRB HICOM Chairman
Yahaya Ahmad dabbled in the automobile world in 1985 during the launch of Malaysia's national car Proton Saga by then Prime Minister of Malaysia Tun Dr Mahathir Mohamad. He was appointed as chairman of the DRB-HICOM on 1 January 1994. Through the company, Yahaya Ahmad managed to capture the national carmaker Proton. In the 1990s the Proton Iswara and Proton Wira was launched. In April 1996, Proton Tiara was launched. Subsequently, in October 1996, Proton through Yahaya Ahmad has taken control of the Lotus. Then taken over by the Managing Director Datuk Seri Mohd Nadzmi Salleh with Tengku Tan Sri Mahaleel Tengku Ariff.

In 1997, the Finance Minister Anwar Ibrahim as the acting Prime Minister of Malaysia together with Tan Sri Yahaya Ahmad, together solve traffic congestion around the city of Kuala Lumpur through the establishment of Intrakota bus (now RapidKL buses)  that providing special access to public transport.

Helicopter crash
On 2 March 1997, Yahaya Ahmad and his wife Rohana Othman were killed in a helicopter crash near Kuala Lipis, Pahang while on their way to visit his ailing mother, Mandak Omar in Marang, Terengganu. After a mid-air explosion, the six-seater Agusta A109P helicopter plunged 2,900m into rubber trees just metres away from houses in Kampung Along, Jerangsang, about 40 km southwest of Kuala Lipis. The pilot Major (R) Azlizan Abdul Manas from Batu Pahat, Johor was also killed. The helicopter, belong to Gadek Aviation Helicopter Sdn Bhd, one of DRB-HICOM's companies, was believed to have had engine trouble about 30 minutes after it took off from the Segambut helipad in Kuala Lumpur. On 4 March 1997, the bodies of Yahaya Ahmad and Rohana Othman were brought back to his hometown in Marang, Terengganu and were buried in a Muslim cemetery in Marang.

After Yahaya's death, the company was taken over by Tan Sri Mohd Saleh Sulong.

Honour

Honour of Malaysia
  : Commander of the Order of Loyalty to the Crown of Malaysia (P.S.M.) (1996)

Legacy
In honour of his contributions to the Malaysian automotive industry. On 15 July 1997, the training centre Institut Kemahiran Mara Pekan (IKM Pekan) in Pekan, Pahang was renamed Institut Kemahiran Mara Tan Sri Yahaya Ahmad Pekan (IKM TSYA Pekan).

There is a street in Dungun, Terengganu was named after him Jalan Yahaya Ahmad.

References

1947 births
1997 deaths
Malaysian people of Malay descent
20th-century Malaysian businesspeople
Malaysian Muslims
Victims of helicopter accidents or incidents
Victims of aviation accidents or incidents in Malaysia
Commanders of the Order of Loyalty to the Crown of Malaysia